Alma Katarina Frostenson Arnault (born 5 March 1953) is a Swedish poet and writer. She was a member of the Swedish Academy from 1992 to 2019.  In 2003, Frostenson was made a Chevalier of the Legion of Honour in France in recognition of her services to literature.

Frostenson is one of Sweden's foremost poets, whose style unites experimental, traditional and archaic elements with a preoccupation with the materiality of language. She has published over two dozen books, primarily poetry. Debuting in 1978 with I mellan (In-Between), she rose to critical acclaim with her collections in the 1980s and 1990s, including Den andra (The Other, 1982), I det gula (In the Yellow, 1985) and Joner (Ions, 1991), which is often seen as one of the most notable collections of Swedish poetry in the twentieth century. She has also written as a dramatist and as a translator from French. Her book of lyrical prose Berättelser från dom (Stories from Them, 1992), about an ancient people who, through the loss of language, lose their sense of belonging in the world.

Her many honors include the Great Prize of the Society of Nine (1989), the Bellman Prize (1994), the Swedish Radio Prize for Lyrical Poetry (1996), the Erik Lindegren Prize (2004), the Ekelöf Prize (2007), the Nordic Council Literature Prize (2016) and the Litteris et Artibus medal (2007).

Early life 
She was born in Stockholm. Her parents were Georg Frostenson (1909–2002) and Anna-Britta Elmdahl (1917–2014). Her uncle Anders Frostenson was married to politician Ulla Lidman-Frostenson (1910-1962), who was Susanna Ramel's elder maternal half-sister.

Poetry 
Katarina Frostenson's work is frequently described as performing a kind of linguistic skepticism (the belief that language is perpetually insufficient to represent reality or contain any essential truth), and as isolating the paradox of using language as the means of its own critique or deconstruction. These limits of language in calling forth reality and experience is also one of the main themes of Katarina Frostenson's work. Her poetry attempts to bring forth experience rather than describe it. In her poetry collections, Frostenson combines shorter poems and longer narrative poems, often with a sense of fragmentation that attempt to convey images or emotions of a specific moment.

Along with a group of other Swedish women poets emerging in the 1980s such as Ann Jäderlund and Birgitta Lillpers, Frostenson's work evinces an attempt to communicate outside of a realm dominated by male writers, focusing on sounds and image rather than a united logos and coherent semantics. Frostenson's poetry stands out in Swedish literary history for its radical linguistic experimentation through a blend of the archaic and the avant-garde; its focus on the intricate sonic qualities of the Swedish language; its references to classical mythology, folksongs, ballads, and canonical Western literary and philosophical figures; and its general lack of metaphor and descriptive language. Her work is orientated towards drawing attention to the material elements of language, that is, sounds, while also being attuned to, playing with, and deconstructing the semantic elements formed out of the phonetic building blocks in search of a purer, authentic or genuine kind of language.

One could say that Frostenson attempts to eliminate all barriers which disrupt emotional and sensory communication. The experience of language's shortcomings is more authentic than its inability to communicate truth. Rather than relying on metaphors and complex attempts at reproducing in language the complexities of human experience, Frostenson's poetry instead gathers fragments of images, emotions, and sounds. Often, each image or feeling appears with an unexpected opposition, creating a dissonance of meaning. For Frostenson, the human senses are more faithful to experience and thus more trustworthy than language as a means of communication.

Frostenson's oeuvre is one of the most influential in Swedish literature. Known first and foremost as a poet, she has published fourteen collections of poetry as well as several works of prose, drama, (creative) nonfiction, translations from French, as well as the libretto for Sven-David Sandström’s opera Staden (The City, 1998). In addition to being nominated for Sweden’s largest literary prize, the August Prize, three times (for Joner in 1991, for Tal och regn [Speech and Rain] in 2008, and for Tre vägar [Three Paths] in 2013), Frostenson has won nearly all the poetry prizes in Sweden and in 2016 was awarded the Nordic Council Literature Prize for her 2015 collection Sånger och formler (Songs and Formulae). She was made a knight of the French Legion of Honor in 2003. Her work has been translated into over ten languages, most notably to French and German (the latter, she has stated, is the language to which her work translates best).

Joner (1991) 
Frostenson's most notable poetry collection is Joner (Ions) from 1991, which is considered her major breakthrough, a milestone in her authorship and a canonical, watershed moment in the Swedish poetic tradition. It is inspired by the gruesome murder of Catrine da Costa, whose remains were found dismembered in two plastic bags, her head was never found, and her murder was never solved. The case would also inspire at least two groundbreaking literary works, including Stieg Larsson’s crime novel Män som hatar kvinnor (The Girl with the Dragon Tattoo, 2005) and Sara Stridsberg's novel Kärlekans Antarktis (Antarctica of Love).  At that time the author of six collections of poetry, Joner brought Frostenson the attention that would result in her election to the Swedish Academy the following year. Given Frostenson’s then established public persona as mysterious, esoteric, and (at least somewhat) elitist, no one had expected Frostenson to engage in public debate, let alone the debate surrounding da Costa’s murder, and the image of her dead body. As Cecelia Sjöholm writes,the weight of Frostenson’s text cannot by detached from the emblematic importance of a beheaded woman that Frostenson was evoking, indicating a wide array of literary and philosophical questions that can be raised by the image of a severed female body. Intertwining an Orphic theme where the positions of Orpheus and Eurydice are reversed, Frostenson examines the question of representation through an actual event and its treatment in the media while invoking the complexities of the Orphic myth; its space and time are shown to be gendered.In addition to presenting the intertextual and gendered intricacies of Frostenson’s poetic language, Sjöholm’s claims offer a counterpoint to the received perception of Frostenson as a poet “without social relevance," which some scholars such as Anders Olsson have pointed out.

2018 Swedish Academy Controversies 

Frostenson and her husband Jean-Claude Arnault ran a venue for showcasing art in Stockholm called Forum. The club received funding from the Swedish Academy, which sparked allegations of conflicts of interest. Thus in 2018, Frostenson was accused of corruption contemporaneous with the accusations of sexual assault and corruption leveled against Arnault. Frostenson was also accused of having leaked names of Nobel Prize laureates to Arnault before they were announced. However, it was discovered that it was commonplace for family members of Academy members to know who was receiving the prize ahead of announcement, according to Ebba Witt-Brattström, ex-wife of Academy member Horace Engdahl. The Academy ultimately decided against expelling Frostenson, which prompted the resignation of three academy members. Frostenson protested that she should not be punished for the wrongdoings of her husband. Nevertheless, she did ultimately and voluntarily withdraw from the academy receiving a lifelong compensation of 12,875 Swedish kronor per month and the right to continue to live in an apartment owned by the Academy.

Bibliography

Poetry 
I mellan (1978)
 Rena land (1980)
 Den andra (1982)
 I det gula: tavlor, resor, ras (1985)
 Samtalet (1987)
 Stränderna (1989)
 Joner : tre sviter (1991)
 Samtalet : Stränderna : Joner (1992)
 Tankarna (1994)
Jan Håfström: en diktsvit till Jan Håfström och till verk av honom (1994)
 Korallen (1999)
 Karkas : fem linjer (2004)
 Tal och regn (2008)
 Flodtid (2011)
 Sånger och formler (2015)
Sju grenar (2018)
A - Andra tankar (2021)
Prose
Raymond Chandler och filmen (1978)
 Lars Ahlins Huset har ingen filial (1978)
Moira (1990)
Berättelser från dom (1992)
Artur Lundkvist: inträdestal i Svenska Akademien (1992)
Skallarna (with Aris Fioretos)
Tre vägar (2013)
K (2019)
F (2020)
Drama/Opera
 4 monodramer (1990)
 3 monodramer (1995)
 Traum : Sal P (två skådespel) (1996)
Kristallvägen/Safirgränd (2000)
 Ordet : en passion (2006)
 Staden: en opera (1998) (music by Sven-David Sandström)
Photobooks (with Jean-Claude Arnault)
 Överblivet (1989)
 Vägen till öarna (1996)
 Endura (2002)
Translations
 1986 – Emmanuel Bove: Mina vänner (Mes amis)
 1987 – Henri Michaux: Bräsch: texter i urval (with Ulla Bruncrona)
 1988 – Marguerite Duras: Lol V. Steins hänförelse (Le ravissement de Lol V. Stein)
 1990 – Georges Bataille: Himlens blå (Le bleu du ciel)

Prizes and Awards 

 1988 – Gerard Bonniers lyrikpris
 1989 – De Nios stora pris
 1994 – Bellman Prize for Tankarna
1996 – Sveriges Radios lyrikpris
 2004 – Erik Lindegren-priset
 2004 – Ferlinpriset
2004 – Henrik Steggen Prize
 2007 – Ekelöfpriset
2007 – Litteris et Artibus
 2016 – Nordic Council Literature Prize (for Sånger och formler)
 2016 – Karlfeldtpriset

References

Katarina Frostenson profile from Svenska Akademien.
Poems, Swedish Book Review.

External links 
Alternative Nobel literature prize planned in Sweden 

Frostensn, Katarina
Frostensn, Katarina
Members of the Swedish Academy
Writers from Stockholm
Swedish poets
Swedish translators
Translators from French
Translators to Swedish
Swedish women poets
20th-century Swedish poets
20th-century Swedish women writers
Litteris et Artibus recipients